Ja još spavam u tvojoj majici (English: I Still Sleep In Your Shirt) is the sixth studio album by Serbian singer Ceca. It was released in 1994 and is the second time she worked with Futa (Aleksandar Radulović) a rock/metal oriented composer, which resulted in rock/folk songs full of guitar riffs.

Track listing
Ja još spavam u tvojoj majici
Devojko veštice
Vazduh koji dišem
Volela sam te
Ne računaj na mene (featuring Mira Škorić)
Neću da budem k'o mašina
K'o nekad u osam
Kuda idu ostavljene devojke

References

1994 albums
Ceca (singer) albums